In ancient Greek religion and mythology, Achelous (also Acheloos or Acheloios) (Ancient Greek: Ἀχελώϊος, and later , Akhelôios) was the god associated with the Achelous River, the largest river in Greece. According to Hesiod, he was the son of the Titans Oceanus and Tethys. He was also said to be the father of the Sirens, several nymphs, and other offspring.

Achelous was able to change his shape, and in the form of a bull, he wrestled Heracles for the right to marry Deianeira, but lost. He was also involved in the legend of the Argive hero Alcmaeon.

Etymology
The name Ἀχελώϊος is possibly pre-Greek, its meaning is not entirely certain. Recent arguments suggest it is Semitic in origin, with the initial Αχ- stemming from the Akkadian aḫu ("bank of the river"), or aḫû ("seashore") and the suffix -ελώἴος, from the Akkadian illu ("watercourse" or "water of the river invading land"). Exact match of the root achel- can be found in the Thracian language, with meaning "water".

Genealogy

According to Hesiod, Achelous, along with all the other river gods, was the son of the Titans Oceanus and Tethys. According to the sixth-century mythographer Acusilaus, Achelous was the "oldest and most honoured" of the river-god offspring of Oceanus. Servius relating a tradition of unknown origin, reports that Achelous was said to have been the son of Earth (i.e. Gaia).  The Renaissance mythographer Natalis Comes wrote that Alcaeus understood Achelous to be the son of Ocean and Earth.

Achelous had various offspring. He was said to be the father of the Sirens. According to the 3rd-century BC poet Lycophron, the Sirens were the daughters of Achelous, by an unnamed "melodious mother" (perhaps meaning the mother was a Muse). Another 3rd-century BC, poet Apollonius of Rhodes, makes the mother the Muse Terpsichore, while according to other accounts, she was the Muse Melpomene, or the Calydonian princess Sterope. Ovid calls the Sirens simply daughters of Achelous, with no mention of their mother. By Perimede, the daughter of Aeolus, Achelous was said to have fathered Hippodamas and Orestes.

Achelous was also said to be the father (with no mothers mentioned) of several nymphs associated with various springs. These included Pirene, the nymph of a spring at Corinth, Castalia, the nymph of a spring at Delphi, and Dirce, the nymph of a spring (and the stream that flowed from it) at Thebes, which became associated with the Dirce who was Antiope's aunt. Plato has "the nymphs" as daughters of Achelous, and the 5th-century BC poet Panyassis seems also to have referred to "Achelesian nymphs". He was also the father (again with no mother mentioned) of Alcmeon's second wife Callirrhoe, whose name means "the lovely spring". Such examples suggest the possibility of a tradition in which Achelous was considered to be the father of all springs or, at least, the nymphs associated with them.

Mythology

Heracles and Deianeira

Achelous was a suitor for Deianeira, daughter of Oeneus, the king of Calydon; he transformed himself into a bull and fought Heracles for the right to marry Deianeira, but was defeated, and Heracles married Deianeira. The story of Achelous, in the form of a bull, battling with Heracles for Deianeira, was apparently told as early as the 7th century BC, in a lost poem by the Greek poet Archilochus, while according to a summary of a lost poem by the early 5th-century BC Greek poet Pindar, during the battle, Heracles broke off one of Achelous's bull-horns, and the river-god was able to get his horn back by trading it for a horn from Amalthea.

Sophocles, in his play Women of Trachis (c. 450–425 BC), has Deianeira tell her story, how Achelous wooed her in the shape of a bull, a snake, and a half-man/half-bull:
For my suitor was a river-god, Achelous, who in three shapes was always asking me from my father—coming now as a bull in visible form, now as a serpent, sheeny and coiled, now ox-faced with human trunk, while from his thick-shaded beard wellheads of fountain-water sprayed. In the expectation that such a suitor would get me, I was always praying in my misery that I might die, before I should ever approach that marriage-bed. But at last, to my joy, the glorious son of Zeus and Alcmena came and closed with him in combat and delivered me.

In later accounts, Achelous does not get his horn back, as he did in Pindar's poem. Ovid, in his poem Metamorphoses (8 AD), has Achelous tell the story. In this version, Achelous fights Heracles, and loses three times: first in his normal (human?) shape, then as a snake, and finally as a bull. Heracles tore off one of Achelous's bull-horns, and the Naiads filled the horn with fruit and flowers, transforming it into the "Horn of Plenty" (cornucopia). According to the Fabulae (before 207 AD), by the Latin mythographer Hyginus, Heracles gave the broken-off horn to "the Hesperides (or Nymphs)", and it was "these goddesses" who "filled the horn with fruit and called it "Cornucopia". According to Strabo, in some versions of the story Heracles gave  Achelous's horn to Deianeira's father Oeneus as a wedding gift.  While several sources make Achelous the father, by various mothers, of the Sirens (see above), according to the 4th-century AD Greek teacher of rhetoric Libanius, they were born from the blood Achelous shed when Heracles broke off his horn.

Both Diodorus Siculus and Strabo provide rationalized accounts of the story. According to Diodorus, Heracles diverted the Achelous River's course, while according to Strabo, some writers "conjecturing the truth from the myths" said that, to please his father-in-law Oeneus, Heracles confined the river by means of "embankments and channels". In this way, Heracles defeated the raging river, and in so doing created a large amount of new fertile land and "certain poets, as we are told, have made this deed into a myth" (Diodorus).  By both accounts, this new bountiful land of the Achelous River delta came to be known as Amaltheia's horn of plenty.

Joseph Fontenrose saw in this story the possible reflection of an ancient tradition of conflict between Zeus and Achelous.

Other stories
Achelous played a role in the story of the Argive hero Alcmaeon, who had killed his mother Eriphyle because of her treachery against his father Amphiaraus, and needed to be religiously purified. According to Apollodorus, Alcmaeon was first purified by Phegeus the king of Psophis, but nevertheless the land of Psophis became barren because of the cursed Alcmaeon's presence. As Thucydides tells the story, the oracle of Apollo told Alcmaeon that he needed to find a land to live in that did not yet exist at the time of his mother's death. After long travels, Alcmaeon finally came to the springs of the Achelous River, where he was purified by the river-god, and received Achelous's daughter Callirrhoe as his wife, and at the mouth of the river he discovered a land newly made by deposits of river silt, where he could make his home free of his curse. Later, according to Apollodorus, Achelous commanded Alcmaeon to dedicate the necklace and robe—the cause of his mother's treachery— at Delphi, which he did.

Ovid, in his Metamorphoses, has the river-god involved in two transformation stories concerning the creation of islands near the mouth of the Achelous River. According to Ovid, the Echinades Islands were once five local nymphs. One day, the nymphs were offering sacrifices to the gods on the banks of the Achelous, but they forgot to include Achelous himself. The river-god became so angry, he overflowed his banks with a raging flood, sweeping the nymphs away into the sea. As Achelous tells the story:
I tore forests from forests, fields from fields; and with the place they stood on, I swept the nymphs away, who at last remembered me then, into the sea. There my flood and the sea, united, cleft the undivided ground into as many parts as now you see the Echinades yonder amid the waves.

Achelous goes on to describe the creation of another island: "far away beyond the others is one island that I love: the sailors call it Perimele." She was the daughter of Hippodamas, whose virginity Achelous took from her. Her enraged father threw her off a high cliff into the sea. But Achelous prayed to Poseidon to save her, and in answer Poseidon transformed the girl into an island.

Cult

From at least as early as Homer, Achelous was apparently considered to be an important divinity throughout Greece. Calling Achelous "king", Homer mentions Achelous (along with Oceanus) as a mighty river, using him as a measure of the strength of (the even mightier) Zeus:
With [Zeus] doth not even king Achelous vie, nor the great might of deep-flowing Ocean, from whom all rivers flow and every sea, and all the springs and deep wells; howbeit even he hath fear of the lightning of great Zeus, and his dread thunder, whenso it crasheth from heaven.
The clear implication is that Achelous is the mightiest of the rivers (save perhaps for Oceanus himself), which would be in accord with Acusilaus' making Achelous the "oldest and most honoured" of the river-god offspring of Oceanus. However some ancient scholars thought that the line: "nor the great might of deep-flowing Ocean", was spurious, which would in fact make Achelous—rather than Oceanus—the source of all other waters. A commentary on Iliad 21.195, preserved on Oxyrhynchus Papyrus 221, contains a fragment of a poem, possibly from the Epic tradition, which mentions "the waters of silver-eddying Achelous" being the source of "the whole sea". A late-5th-century BC commentary on Orphic theogony, preserved by the Derveni Papyrus, quotes a poetic fragment calling the rivers the "sinews of Achelous". The same Oxyrhynchus Papyrus also quotes ancient verses which apparently equated Achelous and Oceanus, and that "many people sacrifice to Achelois before sacrificing to Demeter, since Acheloios is the name of all rivers and the crop comes from water".

According to the early 4th-century BC Greek historian Ephorus, the oracle at Dodona usually added to his pronouncements the command to offer sacrifices to Achelous, and that, while people would offer sacrifices to their local river, only the Achelous river was honoured everywhere, with Achelous's name often being invoked in oaths, prayers and sacrifices, "all the things that concern the gods."

His name was often used to mean "water". Thus Euripides can have a house, far from the Achelous river, being sprinkled with "Achelous' water". Ephorus explained this "puzzle" by saying that, because of the frequent oracular command at Dodona to offer sacrifices to Achelous, it came to be thought that by "Achelous" the oracle meant, not the river but "water" in general.

Plato has Socrates, walking in the countryside, come across a "sacred place of some nymphs and of Achelous, judging by the figurines and statues". The 2nd-century geographer Pausanias, mentions a part of the altar at the Amphiareion of Oropos dedicated to "the nymphs and to Pan, and to the rivers Achelous and Cephisus", as well as an altar to Achelous near Megara, and the Megarian Treasury at Olympia, which contained  a dedication  representing the fight of Heracles with Achelous.

Iconography

Achelous' wrestling bout with Heracles was the subject of several vase-paintings, from as early as the second quarter of the sixth century BC, and in most of these vases, Heracles can be seen grabbing Achelous by his single horn. Possibly the earliest version of the scene (c. 600–560 BC) appears on the figure frieze of a Middle Corinthian kylix cup  (Brussels A1374), which depicts Heracles wrestling with a horned centaur-like Achelous, with a human torso and a bull's or horse's body, watched by the figure of an old man (Oineus?) and a woman (Deiaeira?). The earliest Attic versions (c. 570 BC) depict Achelous as a bull with a man's face and beard.

On one later example (c. 525–475 BC), an Attic red-figure stamnos from Cerveteri attributed to Oltos (London E437), Achelous (identified by inscription) is shown with a bearded human upper torso, attached to a long serpentine body, with a fish's tail. This is similar to the depictions of the sea-god Triton which appear on many other Attic vases. Heracles (also identified by inscription) appears about to break off the river-god's single horn. On a somewhat later (c. 475–425 BC) red-figure Attic column krater (Louvre G365), Achelous's broken-off horn lies on the ground, while Heracles holds Achelous by his other horn, and threatens him with a club held overhead.  Figures depicting Oineus and Deiaeira (as presumably on the Corinthian cup) and also Athena and Hermes are sometimes included in the scene.

Pausanias reports seeing the scene represented on the throne of Amyclae, and also in the Megarian Treasury at Olympia, where he describes seeing "small cedar-wood figures inlaid with gold" which, besides Achelous, included Zeus, Deianeira, Heracles, and Ares aiding Achelous.

The river-god is depicted on several Acarnanian coins as a bull with the head of an old man. The most common depiction of Achelous in Archaic and Classical times was this man-faced bull. Often a city would feature a man-faced bull on its coinage to represent a local variant of Achelous, such as Achelous Gelas of Gela, Sicily, or Achelous Sebethos of Neapolis, Campania.

Possible origins
That Achelous, rather than Oceanus, was perhaps, in some earlier version of the Iliad, the source  of "all rivers ... and every sea", and that his name was often used to mean "water", have (along with other evidence from ancient sources), suggested the possibility to modern scholars that Achelous may have predated Oceanus as the original Greek water-god.

A recent study has tried to show that both the form and substance of Achelous, as a god of water primarily depicted as a man-faced bull, have roots in Old Europe in the Bronze Age. After the disappearance of many Old European cultures, the traditions traveled to the Near East at the beginning of 4th millennium BC (Ubaid period), and finally migrated to Greece, Italy, Sicily, and Sardinia with itinerant sea-folk during the Late Bronze Age through the Orientalizing period. Although no single cult of Achelous persisted throughout all of these generations, the iconography and general mythos easily spread from one culture to another, and all examples of man-faced bulls are found around the area of the Mediterraneanan, suggesting some intercultural continuity.

Achelous was also an important deity in the Etruscan religion, intimately related to water as in the Greek tradition but also carrying significant chthonic associations. Man-faced bull iconography was first adapted to represent Achelous by the Etruscans in the 8th century BC, and the Greeks later adopted this same tradition.

The leading exponents into the Greek and Etruscan worlds were seer-healers and mercenaries during the Iron Age, and Achelous as a man-faced bull becomes an emblem employed by mercenaries in the Greek world for centuries. These earlier figures probably adapted the mythological and iconographic traditions of Asallúhi (also Asarlúhi or Asaruludu), the "princely bison" of Near Eastern traditions that "rises to the surface of the earth in springs and marshes, ultimately flowing as rivers."

The Achelous River

The Achelous River rises in the Pindus mountains, flows into the Ionian Sea near the Echinades Islands in western Greece, and divided ancient Acarnania and Aetolia. Servius gives a story of the origin of the river. He says that one day Achelous, who was said to be the son of Earth, lost his daughters the Sirens, and in his grief he called upon his mother, who received him into her bosom, and on that spot, Earth caused a river, bearing his name, to gush forth.

Pseudo-Plutarch gives a different story for how the river acquired its name. He says it was formerly called Thestius, after a son of Mars and Pisidice, who jumped into the river after discovering he had killed his son Calydon by mistake. In a similar fashion the river acquired the name Achelous, after a son of Oceanus and the nymph Naïs, who jumped into the river after he discovered he had slept with his daughter Cletoria by mistake.

Strabo reports that in "earlier times" the river was called the Thoas. According to Strabo, some writers "conjecturing the truth from the myths" attributed various legends concerning the river-god, to features of the Achelous River itself. These writers said that, like other rivers, the Achelous was called "like a bull", because of the river's roaring waters and its meanders (which he says were called horns). Likewise the Achelous was called "like a serpent" because of the river's great length and many serpentine turnings.

Homer locates another Achelous river in Lydia, near Mount Sipylos, and there were several other rivers with the name Achelous in ancient times. The multiplicity of rivers with the same name, perhaps due to the river-god's equation with water, has also been seen as suggesting the possibility that Achelous was originally "the primal source of all water".

In the Metamorphoses

Ovid, in his Metamorphoses, provided a descriptive interlude when Theseus is the guest of Achelous, waiting for the river's raging flood to subside: "He entered the dark building, made of spongy pumice, and rough tuff. The floor was moist with soft moss, and the ceiling banded with freshwater mussel and oyster shells."

Notes

References
 Andolfi, Ilaria, Acusilaus of Argos’ Rhapsody in Prose: Introduction, Text, and Commentary, Walter de Gruyter GmbH & Co KG, 2019. .
 Apollodorus, Apollodorus, The Library, with an English Translation by Sir James George Frazer, F.B.A., F.R.S. in 2 Volumes. Cambridge, Massachusetts, Harvard University Press; London, William Heinemann Ltd. 1921. Online version at the Perseus Digital Library.
 Apollonius of Rhodes, Apollonius Rhodius: the Argonautica, translated by Robert Cooper Seaton, W. Heinemann, 1912. Internet Archive.
 Aristophanes, Fragments, edited and translated by Jeffrey Henderson, Loeb Classical Library No. 502, Cambridge, Massachusetts, Harvard University Press, 2007. Online version at Harvard University Press. .
 Aristotle, Metaphysics in  Aristotle in 23 Volumes, Vols.17, 18, translated by Hugh Tredennick, Cambridge, Massachusetts, Harvard University Press, London, William Heinemann Ltd. 1932.  Online version at the Perseus Digital Library.
 Bordman, John, "Herakles, Theseus and Amazons" in The Eye of Greece: Studies in the Art of Athens, editors: Donna Kurtz, Brian Sparkes, Cambridge University Press, 1982. .* Campbell, David A., Greek Lyric, Volume I: Sappho and Alcaeus,  Loeb Classical Library No. 142, Cambridge, Massachusetts, Harvard University Press, 1994. . Online version at Harvard University Press. 
 Collard, Christopher and Martin Cropp (2008b), Euripides Fragments: Oedipus-Chrysippus: Other Fragments,  Loeb Classical Library No. 506. Cambridge, Massachusetts, Harvard University Press, 2008. . Online version at Harvard University Press.
 D'Alessio, G. B., (2004), "Textual Fluctuations and Cosmic Streams: Ocean and Acheloios", Journal of Hellenic Studies, Vol. 124, pp. 16–37. .
 Diodorus Siculus, Library of History, Volume III: Books 4.59-8. Translated by C. H. Oldfather. Loeb Classical Library No. 340. Cambridge, Massachusetts: Harvard University Press, 1939. . Online version at Harvard University Press. Online version by Bill Thayer.
 Euripides, Bacchae. Iphigenia. at Aulis Rhesus. Edited and translated by David Kovacs. Loeb Classical Library No. 495. Cambridge, Massachusetts, Harvard University Press, 2003. .  Online version at Harvard University Press.
 Fontenrose, Joseph Eddy, Python: A Study of Delphic Myth and Its Origins, University of California Press, 1959. .
 Fowler, R. L. (2000), Early Greek Mythography: Volume 1: Text and Introduction, Oxford University Press, 2000. .
 Fowler, R. L. (2013), Early Greek Mythography: Volume 2: Commentary, Oxford University Press, 2013. .
 Freeman, Kathleen, Ancilla to Pre-Socratic Philosophers: A Complete Translation of the Fragments in Diels, Fragmente der Vorsokratiker (1948), July 13, 2012 2012, Kindle Edition.
 Gantz, Timothy, Early Greek Myth: A Guide to Literary and Artistic Sources, Johns Hopkins University Press, 1996, Two volumes:  (Vol. 1),  (Vol. 2).
 Grimal, Pierre, The Dictionary of Classical Mythology, Wiley-Blackwell, 1996. .
 Hard, Robin, The Routledge Handbook of Greek Mythology: Based on H.J. Rose's "Handbook of Greek Mythology", Psychology Press, 2004, . Google Books.
 Hesiod, Theogony, in The Homeric Hymns and Homerica with an English Translation by Hugh G. Evelyn-White, Cambridge, Massachusetts, Harvard University Press; London, William Heinemann Ltd. 1914. Online version at the Perseus Digital Library.
 Homer, The Iliad with an English Translation by A.T. Murray, Ph.D. in two volumes. Cambridge, Massachusetts, Harvard University Press; London, William Heinemann, Ltd. 1924. Online version at the Perseus Digital Library.
 Hyginus, Gaius Julius, Fabulae in Apollodorus' Library and Hyginus' Fabulae: Two Handbooks of Greek Mythology, Translated, with Introductions by R. Scott Smith and Stephen M. Trzaskoma, Hackett Publishing Company,  2007. .
 Isler, Hans Peter. Acheloos: Eine Monographie. Bern: Francke, 1970.
 Isler, Hans Peter. "Acheloos". LIMC, vol. 1, Zürich: Artemis & Verlag, 1981, p. 12–36.
 Jannot, Jean-Rene. "Acheloos, le taureau androcephale et les masques cornus dans l'Etrurie archaique," in Latomus 33, 4. Bruxelles: Latomus.
Jebb, Richard Claverhouse, Sophocles: The Plays and Frgaments, with critical notes, commentary, and translation in English prose. Part V: The Trachiniae, Cambridge University Press, 1902.
 Kerényi, Carl, The Heroes of the Greeks,  Thames and Hudson, London, 1959.
 Kerényi, Carl, The Gods of the Greeks,  Thames and Hudson, London, 1951.
 Kern, Otto. Orphicorum Fragmenta, Berlin, 1922. Internet Archive.
 Lloyd-Jones, Hugh, Sophocles: Fragments, Edited and translated by Hugh Lloyd-Jones, Loeb Classical Library No. 483, Cambridge, Massachusetts, Harvard University Press, 1996. . Online version at Harvard University Press.
 Luce, Stephen Bleecker, "Heracles and Achelous on a Cylix in Boston" in American Journal of Archaeology: The Journal of the Archaeological Institute of America, Macmillan Company, 1923.
 Lycophron, Alexandra (or Cassandra) in Callimachus and Lycophron with an English translation by A. W. Mair ; Aratus, with an English translation by G. R. Mair, London: W. Heinemann, New York: G. P. Putnam 1921. Internet Archive.
 Macrobius, Saturnalia, Volume II: Books 3-5, edited and translated by Robert A. Kaster, Loeb Classical Library No. 511, Cambridge, Massachusetts, Harvard University Press, 2011. Online version at Harvard University Press. .
 March, Jenny. Cassell’s Dictionary of Classical Mythology, 2001. .
 Molinari, Nicholas, and Nicola Sisci. Potamikon: Sinews of Acheloios. A Comprehensive Catalog of the Bronze Coinage of the Man-Faced Bull, with Essays on Origin and Identity. Oxford: Archaeopress Archaeology, 2016. .
 Most, G.W., Hesiod: The Shield, Catalogue of Women, Other Fragments, Loeb Classical Library, No. 503, Cambridge, Massachusetts, Harvard University Press, 2007, 2018. . Online version at Harvard University Press.
 Nonnus, Dionysiaca; translated by Rouse, W H D, I Books I–XV. Loeb Classical Library No. 344, Cambridge, Massachusetts, Harvard University Press; London, William Heinemann Ltd. 1940. Internet Archive.
 Nonnus, Dionysiaca; translated by Rouse, W H D, II Books XVI–XXXV. Loeb Classical Library No. 345, Cambridge, Massachusetts, Harvard University Press; London, William Heinemann Ltd. 1940. Internet Archive.
 Nonnus, Dionysiaca; translated by Rouse, W H D, III Books XXXVI–XLVIII. Loeb Classical Library No. 346, Cambridge, Massachusetts, Harvard University Press; London, William Heinemann Ltd. 1940. Internet Archive.
 Ovid, Amores, Christopher Marlowe, Ed. Online version at the Perseus Digital Library.
 Ovid, Ovid's Fasti: With an English translation by Sir James George Frazer, London: W. Heinemann LTD; Cambridge, Massachusetts, Harvard University Press, 1959. Internet Archive.
 Ovid. Heroides. Amores. Translated by Grant Showerman. Revised by G. P. Goold. Loeb Classical Library No. 41. Cambridge, Massachusetts: Harvard University Press, 1977. . Online version at Harvard University Press.
 Ovid. Metamorphoses, Volume II: Books 9-15. Translated by Frank Justus Miller. Revised by G. P. Goold. Loeb Classical Library No. 43. Cambridge, Massachusetts: Harvard University Press, 1984, first published 1916. . Online version at Harvard University Press.
 Parada, Carlos, Genealogical Guide to Greek Mythology, Jonsered, Paul Åströms Förlag, 1993. .
 Pausanias, Pausanias Description of Greece with an English Translation by W.H.S. Jones, Litt.D., and H.A. Ormerod, M.A., in 4 Volumes. Cambridge, Massachusetts, Harvard University Press; London, William Heinemann Ltd. 1918. Online version at the Perseus Digital Library.
 Philostratus the Younger, Imagines, in Philostratus the Elder, Imagines. Philostratus the Younger, Imagines. Callistratus, Descriptions. Translated by Arthur Fairbanks. Loeb Classical Library No. 256. Cambridge, Massachusetts: Harvard University Press, 1931.  . Online version at Harvard University Press. Internet Archive 1926 edition.
 Plato, Phaedrus in Plato in Twelve Volumes, Vol. 9 translated by Harold N. Fowler, Cambridge, Massachusetts, Harvard University Press; London, William Heinemann Ltd. 1925. Online version at the Perseus Digital Library.
 Propertius, Elegies Edited and translated by G. P. Goold. Loeb Classical Library 18. Cambridge, Massachusetts: Harvard University Press, 1990.  Online version at Harvard University Press.* Schironi, Francesca, The Best of the Grammarians: Aristarchus of Samothrace on the Iliad, University of Michigan Press, 2018. .
 Schefold, Karl, Luca Giuliani, Gods and Heroes in Late Archaic Greek Art, Cambridge University Press, 1992 .
 Servius, Commentary on the Georgics of Vergil, Georgius Thilo, Ed. 1881. Online version at the Perseus Digital Library (Latin).
 Smith, William (1854), Dictionary of Greek and Roman Geography, London. Online version at the Perseus Digital Library.
 Smith, William (1873), Dictionary of Greek and Roman Biography and Mythology, London. Online version at the Perseus Digital Library.
 Sophocles, The Trachiniae in  The Trachiniae of Sophocles. Edited with introduction and notes by Sir Richard Jebb, Sir Richard Jebb, Cambridge, Cambridge University Press, 1898. Online version at the Perseus Digital Library.
 Stafford, Emma, Herakles: Gods and Heroes of the Ancient World, Routledge, 2012. .* Statius, Statius with an English Translation by J. H. Mozley, Volume I, Silvae, Thebaid, Books I–IV, Loeb Classical Library No. 206, London: William Heinemann, Ltd., New York: G. P. Putnamm's Sons, 1928. . Internet Archive
 Strabo, Geography, translated by Horace Leonard Jones; Cambridge, Massachusetts: Harvard University Press; London: William Heinemann, Ltd. (1924). LacusCurtis, Online version at the Perseus Digital Library, Books 6–14
 Thucydides, Thucydides translated into English; with introduction, marginal analysis, notes, and indices. Volume 1., Benjamin Jowett. translator. Oxford. Clarendon Press. 1881. Online version at the Perseus Digital Library.
 Tripp, Edward, Crowell's Handbook of Classical Mythology, Thomas Y. Crowell Co; First edition (June 1970). .
 West, M. L. (1983), The Orphic Poems, Clarendon Press. .
 West, M. L. (2003), Greek Epic Fragments: From the Seventh to the Fifth Centuries BC, edited and translated by Martin L. West, Loeb Classical Library No. 497, Cambridge, Massachusetts, Harvard University Press, 2003.  . Online version at Harvard University Press.

External links

Theoi Project - Potamos Akheloios

Potamoi
Achelous River
Metamorphoses characters
Aetolian characters in Greek mythology
Cattle deities
Metamorphoses into bodies of water in Greek mythology
Deeds of Gaia

kk:Ахелой (Бургас облысы)